Zeugophora is a genus of beetles in the family Megalopodidae, containing the following species:

 Zeugophora abnormis (J. L. LeConte, 1850)
 Zeugophora aethiops Medvedev, 1995
 Zeugophora africana (Bryant, 1943)
 Zeugophora albiseta Reid, 1989
 Zeugophora alticola (Gressitt, 1959)
 Zeugophora ancora Reitter, 1900
 Zeugophora annulata (Baly, 1873)
 Zeugophora apicata Medvedev, 2007
 Zeugophora atra Fall, 1926
 Zeugophora atrosuturalis (Pic, 1917)
 Zeugophora belokobylskii Lopatin, 1995
 Zeugophora bicolor (Kraatz, 1879)
 Zeugophora bicoloripes Pic, 1939
 Zeugophora bifasciata Gressitt & Kimoto, 1961
 Zeugophora bimaculata Kraatz, 1879
 Zeugophora bistriolata Schöller, 2009
 Zeugophora brancucii Medvedev, 1993
 Zeugophora buonloicus Medvedev, 1985
 Zeugophora californica Crotch, 1874
 Zeugophora cameroonica Medvedev, 1998
 Zeugophora capensis (Bryant, 1943)
 Zeugophora carolae Gressitt, 1965
 Zeugophora chinensis Medvedev, 1998
 Zeugophora chloropelta (Achard, 1916)
 Zeugophora chujoi Ohno, 1961
 Zeugophora consanguinea Crotch, 1873
 Zeugophora crassicornis Medvedev, 1998
 Zeugophora cribrata Chen, 1974
 Zeugophora cupka Takemoto, 2019
 Zeugophora cyanea Chen, 1974
 Zeugophora daccordii Schöller, 2009
 Zeugophora decorata (Chujo, 1937)
 Zeugophora dimorpha (Gressitt, 1945)
 Zeugophora emeica Li & Liang, 2018
 Zeugophora enduwakombukoensis Sekerka, 2007
 Zeugophora euonymorum Li & Liang, 2020
 Zeugophora fasciata Medvedev, 1998
 Zeugophora flavicollis (Marsha, 1802)
 Zeugophora flavitarsis Medvedev, 1998
 Zeugophora flavithorax Li & Liang, 2020
 Zeugophora flavonotata (Chujo, 1935)
 Zeugophora formosana (Gressitt, 1954)
 Zeugophora frontalis Suffrian, 1840
 Zeugophora gede Reid, 1998
 Zeugophora gracilis (Chujo, 1937)
 Zeugophora hanungus Medvedev, 1985
 Zeugophora himalayana Medvedev, 1998
 Zeugophora hozumii Chujo, 1953
 Zeugophora humeralis (Achard, 1914)
 Zeugophora impressa Chen & Pu, 1962
 Zeugophora indica Jacoby, 1903
 Zeugophora japanica Chujo, 1951
 Zeugophora javana Reid, 1992
 Zeugophora kwaiensis (Weise, 1900)
 Zeugophora longicornis (Westwood, 1864)
 Zeugophora luzonica (Weise, 1922)
 Zeugophora maai Kimoto & Gressitt, 1979
 Zeugophora maculata (Chujo, 1941)
 Zeugophora madagascariensis (Jacoby, 1897)
 Zeugophora medvedevi Lopatin, 2002
 Zeugophora multisignata (Pic, 1944)
 Zeugophora multnomah Hatch, 1971
 Zeugophora murrayi (Clark, 1865)
 Zeugophora neomexicana Schaeffer, 1919
 Zeugophora nepalica Medvedev, 1988
 Zeugophora nigricollis (Jacoby, 1885)
 Zeugophora nigroaerea Lopatin, 2008
 Zeugophora nigroapica Li & Liang, 2018
 Zeugophora nigrocincta (Pic, 1924)
 Zeugophora nitida (Chujo, 1932)
 Zeugophora novobicolor Rodríguez-Mirón, 2018
 Zeugophora ornata (Achard, 1914)
 Zeugophora pallidicincta Gressitt, 1945
 Zeugophora papuana Medvedev, 2009
 Zeugophora parva Crowson, 1946
 Zeugophora puberula Crotch, 1873
 Zeugophora riedeli Medvedev, 2007
 Zeugophora ruficollis (Chujo, 1932)
 Zeugophora scutellaris Suffrian, 1840
 Zeugophora setsukoae Gressitt, 1965
 Zeugophora subspinosa (Fabricius, 1781)
 Zeugophora sumatrana (Jacoby, 1896)
 Zeugophora suturalis (Achard, 1914)
 Zeugophora testaceipes (Pic, 1939)
 Zeugophora tetraspilota Medvedev, 1998
 Zeugophora tricolor Chen & Pu, 1962
 Zeugophora trifasciata Li & Liang, 2020
 Zeugophora trisignata An & Kwon, 2002
 Zeugophora turneri Power, 1863
 Zeugophora unifasciata (Jacoby, 1885)
 Zeugophora variabilis (Achard, 1914)
 Zeugophora varians Crotch, 1873
 Zeugophora varipes (Jacoby, 1885)
 Zeugophora vitinea (Oke, 1932)
 Zeugophora weisei Reitter, 1889
 Zeugophora williamsi Reid, 1989
 Zeugophora wittmeri Medvedev, 1993
 Zeugophora xanthopoda Bezdek & Silfverberg, 2010
 Zeugophora yuae Li and Liang, 2020
 Zeugophora yunnanica Chen & Pu, 1962

References

Megalopodidae genera
Megalopodidae
Taxa named by Gustav Kunze